The 1910 Pennsylvania Gubernatorial election was held on November 8, 1910. The main candidates were Republican John K. Tener, Democrat Webster Grim, Keystone Party leader William H. Berry, and Socialist John W. Slayton.

Candidates

Democratic
 Webster Grim, State Senator (from Bucks County)
 running mate: Thomas Greevy, attorney (from Blair County)

Keystone
 William H. Berry, former Pennsylvania State Treasurer (from Chester County)
 running mate: Clarence Gibboney, attorney (from Philadelphia County)

Republican
 John K. Tener, U.S. Congressman (from Washington County)
 running mate: John Reynolds (from Lancaster County)

Campaign
The election was mired in scandal. The main focus was on the Pennsylvania state capitol building, which cost $13 million to build, of which $9 million went for furnishings. Although the state Republican machine remained powerful, its reputation was in shambles, as five insiders were arrested in connection with the capitol cost overruns. Boies Penrose, the U.S. Senator and Republican boss searched for a candidate with high name recognition but little political experience to improve the standing of his organization. Penrose chose Tener, a famous 19th century baseball player who had kept a low profile as a banker until running for Congress in 1909.

Democrats, meanwhile, tried to turn to Berry as their candidate, as they believed he had the perfect reform image due to being the catalyst in uncovering the scandal. Berry was initially opposed by attorney Cyrus Munson, a party boss, but after he withdrew due to health concerns, Penrose attempted to infiltrate the Democratic convention. His move resulted in the nomination of State Senator Grim from Doylestown, and reformers from both parties attempted to rally behind Berry, who ran under the banner of the "Keystone Party". George W. Guthrie unsuccessfully ran for the party's nomination.

Although Penrose viewed Tener as a pawn, he was a viable campaigner in his own right. Tener took much more progressive stances than Penrose had envisioned, supporting education expansion, greater public finance for road construction, and women's suffrage. Tener also ran on his wholesome image as an old time ballplayer in an era when gambling concerns overran the sport. While Tener was unable to gain a majority of the vote, he was able to defeat Berry, as Grim, who had the support of the party machinery, split enough of the progressive vote to lead to a Republican win.

Results

|-
! style="background-color:#FFCC00; width: 3px" |
| style="width: 130px" | Keystone
| William H. Berry
| align="right" | 382,127
| align="right" | 38.27

References

1910
Pennsylvania
Gubernatorial
November 1910 events